Javier Hernandez Cebrian (born 26 November 1983 in Santa Cruz) is a Spanish Real Club Náutico de Tenerife sailor. He competed at the 2008 and 2012 Summer Olympics in the Men's Laser class.

Notes

References

External links
 
 
 

1983 births
Living people
Spanish male sailors (sport)
Olympic sailors of Spain
Sailors at the 2008 Summer Olympics – Laser
Sailors at the 2012 Summer Olympics – Laser